Grandmother Mountain may refer to:

 Grandmother Mountain (Idaho) in Idaho, USA 
 Grandmother Mountain (New Mexico) in New Mexico, USA 
 Grandmother Mountain (North Carolina) in North Carolina, USA